Kringel may refer to:
 Kringle, a Scandinavian variety of pretzel
 Chris Kringel, American bass guitarist and musical author